The 2001 NCAA Division II women's basketball tournament was the 20th annual tournament hosted by the NCAA to determine the national champion of Division II women's  collegiate basketball in the United States.

Cal Poly Pomona defeated North Dakota in the championship game, 87–80 after overtime, to claim the Broncos' fourth NCAA Division II national title and first since 1986.

The championship rounds were contested at Mayo Civic Center in Rochester, Minnesota.

Regionals

East - Shippensburg, Pennsylvania
Location: Heiges Field House Host: Shippensburg University of Pennsylvania

Great Lakes - Houghton, Michigan
Location: SDC Gymnasium Host: Michigan Technological University

North Central - Grand Forks, North Dakota
Location: Hyslop Sports Center Host: University of North Dakota

Northeast - Waltham, Massachusetts
Location: Dana Center Host: Bentley College

South - Cleveland, Mississippi
Location: Walter Sillers Coliseum Host: Delta State University

South Atlantic - Columbus, Georgia
Location: Frank G. Lumpkin Center Host: Columbus State University

South Central - Emporia, Kansas
Location: White Auditorium Host: Emporia State University

West - Pomona, California
Location: Kellogg Gym Host: California State Polytechnic University, Pomona

Elite Eight - Rochester, Minnesota
Location: Mayo Civic Center Host: Winona State University

All-tournament team
 Aprile Powell, Cal Poly Pomona
 LaTasha Burnett, Cal Poly Pomona
 Jenny Boll, North Dakota
 Mandy Arndtson, North Dakota
 Jessie Gordon, Shippensburg

See also
 2001 NCAA Division I women's basketball tournament
 2001 NCAA Division III women's basketball tournament
 2001 NAIA Division I women's basketball tournament
 2001 NAIA Division II women's basketball tournament
 2001 NCAA Division II men's basketball tournament

References
 2001 NCAA Division II women's basketball tournament jonfmorse.com

 
NCAA Division II women's basketball tournament
2001 in Minnesota